Coretta is an American thoroughbred which raced in 1998 and 1999.

Coretta or Corretta may also refer to:
Given name
 Coretta Scott King (1927–2006), wife of Martin Luther King, Jr.
 Coretta Brown (born 1980), basketball player
 Corretta Lipp, character in Ally McBeal played by Regina Hall
 Coretta "The Ox" Cox, character in The Steve Harvey Show played by The Lady of Rage
Other
 Coretta, Oklahoma, original name of Okay, Oklahoma

See also
 La capricciosa corretta opera
 Loretta, similarly spelled female given name
 Corita, similarly spelled female given name